Stefaan G. Verhulst (born 1966) is the co-founder and chief research and development officer of The Governance Laboratory (The GovLab) at New York University. His research and writing considers how advances in technology and science can be harnessed to create effective and collaborative forms of governance.

In addition to GovLab, he holds several other academic and professional positions including the following:

 Senior advisor to the Markle Foundation, a private non-profit organization committed to promoting the development of communications industries that address public needs, where he was Chief of Research for 11 years;
 Adjunct Professor in the Department of Media, Culture, and Communication at New York University;
 Senior associated fellow in the Programme in Comparative Media Law and Policy at Oxford University which he co-founded several years ago;
 Senior research fellow at the Center for Global Communication Studies, Annenberg School for Communication at the University of Pennsylvania;
 Senior research fellow for the Center for Media and Communications Studies, Central European University in Budapest; and
 International Fellow of the Information Society Project at Yale Law School;
 Fellow for the Center for Democracy & Technology;
 Advisor to Global Partners Digital.
 Expert on the Influencer Advisory Board of sparks & honey
 Board member for Obricom-UNESCO

Prior to joining the Markle Foundation in 2001, Verhulst held several senior research positions in Belgium and the UK - including the University of Glasgow and Oxford University.

He co-founded the Programme in Comparative Media Law and Policy at Oxford University with Monroe Price. At Oxford, he was also the UNESCO Chairholder in Communications Law and Policy for the UK and the Socio-Legal research Fellow at Wolfson College. He has spoken at TedXMidAtlantic's New Rules seminar.

Books and publications 

Verhulst is the author and co-editor of several publications, including the following books, reports and chapters listed below. He is also the founder and editor-in-chief of the International Journal of Communications Law and Policy, and the Communications Law in Transition Newsletter and is a member of several editorial boards.

 Verhulst (S.) and Price (M.), Handbook of Media Law and Policy – A SocioLegal Exploration, Routledge, 2013
 Price, Monroe; Puppis, Manuel; Verhulst, Stefaan. "Media Policy and Governance." In Oxford Bibliographies in Communication. Ed. Patricia Moy. New York: Oxford University Press, forthcoming.
 Verhulst, Stefaan. "Net Neutrality and the Media" in Mapping Digital Media. Open Society Foundations Reference Series No. 7, London, United Kingdom: 2011
 Verhulst (S.) and Price (M.), Comparative Media Law and Policy: Opportunities and Challenges. In: Thussu (D.), Internationalizing Media Studies: Impediments and Imperatives, Routledge
 Verhulst (S.), Linked Geographies: Maps as Mediators of Reality. In: Turow (J.) The Hyperlinked Society. Questioning Connections in The Digital Age. University of Michigan (University of Michigan Press, 2008)
 Verhulst (S.), Emerging patterns of Broadcasting regulation. In: Buckley (S.), Duer (K.), Mendel (T.), and O'Siochru (S.), Broadcasting, Voice, and Accountability, A Public Interest Approach to Policy, Law, and Regulation, University of Michigan Press, (University of Michigan Press, 2008)
 Verhulst (S.), Mediation, Mediators, and New Intermediaries. In: Napoli (P.), Media Diversity and Localism:  Meaning and Metrics. Laurence Erlbaum, 2006
 Verhulst (S.), Digital Content Regulation. In: Lievrouw (L.) & Livingstone (S.) Handbook of New Media (Student Edition). Sage, 2005
 Verhulst (S.) and Price (M.), Self-regulation and the Internet, Kluwer, 2005
 Verhulst (S.) and Sandvig,(C.) The Internet and public policy in comparative perspective (working title). In M. Price & H. Nissenbaum (Eds.), The Academy and the Internet. New York: Peter Lang, 2004.
 Verhulst (S.) and Price (M.), Parental Control of Television Broadcasting, LEA, 2002
 Verhulst (S.), Price (M.) and Rozumilowicz. Media Reform. Democratizing the media, democratizing the state. London; Routledge, 2001
 Verhulst (S.), About Scarcities and Intermediaries. Reviewing the Regulatory Paradigm Shift. In: Livingstone (S.) and Lievrouw (L.), Handbook of New Media. Sage, 2001
 Verhulst (S), Tambini (D), Forgan (L) and Hall (C.), Communications Revolution and Reform, IPPR, 2001
 Verhulst (S.) and Price (M), Conceptual Approaches to Self Regulation. In: Marsden (C.), Regulating the Global Information Society. Routledge, 2000
 Verhulst (S.), Holznagel (B.), and Hahne (K.), Verhinderung des Digital Divide als Zukunftsaufgabe. Ein Plädoyer gegen die Errichtung von E-Barriers. In: Kommunikation & Recht (K&R) 2000, 425-431
 Verhulst (S.) and Price (M.), Self Regulation. In: Jens Waltermann and  Marcel Machill (eds.): Protecting our children on the Internet - Towards a new culture of responsibility, Gütersloh; Bertelsmann Foundation Publishers, 2000
 Verhulst (S.) and Marsden (C.), Convergence in European Digital TV Regulation, Blackstone, 1999
 Verhulst (S.), Goldberg (D.), and Prosser (T.), Legal Responses to the Changing Media. OUP, 1998
 Price (M.) and Verhulst (S.), Broadcasting Reform in India. Oxford University Press, 1998
 Goldberg (D.) and Verhulst (S.), European Media Policy: Complexity and Comprehensiveness. In: d'Haenens (L.) and Saeys (F.), ed., Media Dynamics and Regulatory Concerns in the Digital Age. Quintessenz-Verlag, 1998
 Verhulst (S.) and Young (A.), The Global Impact of Open Data. O'Reilly, 2016

Consultancies 
Verhulst has served as consultant to various international and national organizations, including the following:
 10 Downing Street (UK Prime Minister's Office)
 Aspen Institute
 Bertelsmann Foundation
 Broadcasting Standards Commission (London)
 Council of Europe
 Digital Video Broadcasting Group (Geneva)
 European Commission
 European Research Institute of the Consumer Organizations (ERICA - London)
 Government of the United Kingdom – Department for International Development (DFID)
 House of Commons of the United Kingdom 
 Organization for Security and Co-operation in Europe (OSCE)
 Paul, Weiss, Rifkind, Wharton & Garrison (Washington DC)
 UNESCO – Africa
 United States Agency for International Development (USAID)
 World Bank

References 

1966 births
Living people
Yale Information Society Project Fellows
Open government in the United States
New York University faculty
Fellows of Wolfson College, Oxford
American technology writers
Academics of the University of Oxford
University of Pennsylvania fellows
Academic staff of Central European University